Mexacanthus is a genus of flowering plants belonging to the family Acanthaceae.

Its native range is Southwestern Mexico.

Species
Species:
 Mexacanthus mcvaughii T.F.Daniel

References

Acanthaceae
Acanthaceae genera